Troon is a development consisting of a country club, golf course and housing in North Scottsdale, Arizona, United States.  The golf course was designed by Jay Morrish and Tom Weiskopf. It first admitted women in 2016.

References

External links
Troon Country Club
Troon Village Association